The Finnish Operations Research Society (FORS) (in Finnish, Suomen Operaatiotutkimusseura ry) is a professional non-profit society for the scientific field of Operations Research in Finland. The society is recognized by the International Federation of Operational Research Societies and its subgrouping, the Association of European Operational Research Societies, as the main national society for Operations Research in its country.

History 

The society was established in 1973. It was founded by 60 people interested in OR who worked in business, public administration and academia.

Governance 

The management of the society is overseen by a board of 6 members, including chairman, secretary and four other members and 6 deputy members. The board is elected annually.

The current president is Timo Kuosmanen. Honorary presidents of FORS include Christer Carlsson, Pekka Korhonen, Raimo Hämäläinen and Jyrki Wallenius.

Membership 

Currently (2014), the society has about 210 members - individuals and institutions from academia, industry and administration.

Publications 
FORS publishes a newsletter, which is aimed at members of the society. The content includes topical OR related news, announcements of events, conference trip stories and summaries of theses published in Finland. Most of the content is in Finnish language.

Conferences 
The society organizes one to two seminars per year. The size ranges. Smaller events can have about 20 participants and larger events even 100.

References

External links 
 

Operations research societies
Research institutes in Finland
Organizations established in 1973